The canton of Guer is an administrative division of the Morbihan department, northwestern France. Its borders were modified at the French canton reorganisation which came into effect in March 2015. Its seat is in Guer.

It consists of the following communes:
 
Allaire
Augan
Béganne
Beignon
Carentoir
Cournon
Les Fougerêts
La Gacilly
Guer
Monteneuf
Peillac
Porcaro
Réminiac
Rieux
Saint-Gorgon
Saint-Jacut-les-Pins
Saint-Jean-la-Poterie
Saint-Malo-de-Beignon
Saint-Martin-sur-Oust
Saint-Perreux
Saint-Vincent-sur-Oust
Théhillac
Tréal

References

Cantons of Morbihan